Pinewood may refer to:

 Pine wood, the wood from pine trees

Places

Canada 
 Pinewood (North Bay), a neighborhood in North Bay, Ontario, Canada
 Pinewood, Ontario, a township in Ontario, Canada

England 
 Pinewood, Berkshire
 Pinewood, Hampshire, a village
 Pinewood, Suffolk

United States 
 Pinewood, Florida, a census-designated place in Miami-Dade County
 Pinewoods Dance Camp in Plymouth, Massachusetts
 Pinewood, Minnesota, an unincorporated area in Beltrami County
 Pinewood, South Carolina, a town in Sumter County
 Pinewood (Nunnelly, Tennessee), a former historic mansion and plantation
 Pinewood Estates, Texas, an unincorporated community in Hardin County
 Pinewoods (Lightfoot, Virginia), a historic home

Other uses
 "Pinewood" (Gotham), an episode of Gotham
 Pinewood Group, an international group of film production studios
 Pinewood Studios, a film studio in Britain
 Pinewood Toronto Studios, a film studio in Toronto, Canada
 Pinewood Iskandar Malaysia Studios, a studio complex in Johor, Malaysia

See also
 Pinewood derby, a kind of toy car race associated with the Boy Scouts of America
 Pinewood Derby (South Park), a 2009 episode of the television show South Park
 Pinewood Elementary School (disambiguation)
 Pinewood School (disambiguation)
 Piney Woods (disambiguation)
 Pine (disambiguation)
 Wood (disambiguation)